Roy Diblik is an American perennial garden designer, plant nurseryman, and author of The Know Maintenance Perennial Garden (2014). He co-owns the Northwind Perennial Farm in Burlington, Wisconsin.

Diblik has collaborated with Dutch garden designer Piet Oudolf on projects such as the Lurie Garden in Chicago, Illinois.

References

American gardeners
American landscape and garden designers
American garden writers
Place of birth missing (living people)
People from Burlington, Wisconsin
21st-century American non-fiction writers
Living people
Year of birth missing (living people)
Businesspeople from Wisconsin